Serhiy Hennadiyovych Arbuzov (born 24 March 1976) is a Ukrainian former banker and politician who briefly served as acting Prime Minister of Ukraine from 28 January to 22 February 2014, following the resignation of Mykola Azarov amidst the escalating Euromaidan movement. He previously served as First Vice Prime Minister of Ukraine from 24 December 2012 to 28 January 2014. On 27 February 2014, in the aftermath of the Revolution of Dignity, Arbuzov was dismissed, and Arseniy Yatsenyuk was elected as the new Prime Minister.

After the Revolution of Dignity, Arbuzov fled to Russia, where he resides in the prestigious Rublevka area in Moscow in exile and is wanted by the General Prosecutor of Ukraine. Arbuzov’s defense insists that it is political persecution.

Arbuzov is the former chairman of the National Bank of Ukraine and was the youngest chairman of the National Bank in Europe at the time of his appointment as First Vice Prime Minister. In the 2000s, Arbuzov worked as a director of several leading Ukrainian banks, including Privatbank and Ukreximbank.

Biography

Arbuzov was born in Donetsk. He graduated from the Donetsk State University, having specialized in "finance and credit" and qualified as an economist. At the start of his professional career, Arbuzov worked as an administration chairman of Privatbank in Donetsk and a director of Privatbank in Kostyantynivka. In 2003-10 he was a director of the Ukrainian Business Bank, previously known as Donechyna.

In 2005 Arbuzov became a member of Our Ukraine and in 2006, unsuccessfully ran for the Donetsk Regional Council as a member of the party. Upon his appointment, to the National Bank of Ukraine, his political affiliation became uncertain.

In 2010 Arbuzov was appointed chairman of the Supervising Council of UkrEximBank, and in September 2010, he became a deputy chairman of the National Bank of Ukraine. On December 21 2010, the President of Ukraine sent a petition to the parliament to replace Volodymyr Stelmakh with Arbuzov. On December 23, 2010 the Verkhovna Rada approved the petition, making Arbuzov the youngest chairman of a state central bank. After the appointment, the older son of the President, Oleksandr Yanukovych, bought the All-Ukrainian Bank of Development from Arbuzov. The bank's chairperson is Arbuzov's mother, Valentyna, who also has extensive experience in the banking business.

In May 2012, the Ukrainian magazine Focus pointed out that Arbuzov has the highest salary among Ukrainian civil servants - ₴140,000 per month (approximately $18,000). In the same year, another Ukrainian magazine, Korrespondent, placed him among the thirty most influential people in the country.

As the chairman of the National Bank, he was best remembered for a set of measures directed at maintaining the stability of the hryvnia. In particular, it refers to the imposition of obligation for importers to sell 50% of their foreign currency revenue at the interbank currency market, as well as the reduction of the term of repayment of currency revenue to 90 days. Alongside this, a slowdown of the inflation rate was secured.

On 24 December 2012, Viktor Yanukovych appointed Arbuzov the First Vice Prime Minister of Ukraine by presidential decree.

As the First Vice Prime Minister, he was engaged in European integration issues. In particular, in October and December 2013, Arbuzov held a series of meetings with the European Commissioner for Enlargement and European Neighbourhood Policy Štefan Füle in Brussels, where a series of consultations were held on the implementation of the Association Agreement with the European Union. Arbuzov initiated the preparation of the so-called “road map” document, in which the Association Agreement process was set out on a phased basis.While in Government, Arbuzov also initiated a series of reforms in the taxation system, streamlining customs procedures, property rights protection, deregulation of business operations, value enhancement, etc. On October 29 2013 World Bank published another Doing Business rating, where Ukraine rose by 28 positions and ranked 112th among 189 analyzed world economics. The best results were in obtaining construction permits (from 183rd to 41st rating position), and registration of property rights (from 197th to 97th rating position). Ukraine ranked 13th for ease in getting credit by businesses in the overall Doing Business rating.

After weeks of Euromaidan protests and clashes, during which civilians were killed, Prime Minister Mykola Azarov offered his letter of resignation on 28 January 2014. The same day President Yanukovych accepted the resignation and signed a decree dismissing the second Azarov Government, which decree would not take effect until the Verkhovna Rada approved a new Cabinet. Hence the second Azarov Government continued as a caretaker government. And Arbuzov replaced Azarov as Prime Minister of Ukraine. On 29 March 2014, during a party congress, Arbuzov was expelled from the Party of Regions. Despite trying to bring about a resolution to the dispute between authorities and opposition, Sergij Arbuzov was bound to leave the country after the change of regime. Arbuzov is wanted by the General Prosecutor of Ukraine and is believed to be hiding in Russia.

The new Ukrainian government has incriminated Arbuzov in the theft of ₴120 million of profit from the BTB channel, which he has initiated to launch. But according to Igor Fomin, Arbuzov’s attorney for the defense, the proceedings should be ceased because “the channel has not made a profit for the whole period of its existence”. Thus, according to defense, there is an absence of elements of the crime. Later General Prosecutor’s Office also confirmed it.

On 11 September 2015, the Prosecutor General's Office of Ukraine announced the arrest of non-resident companies accounts affiliated with Arbuzov in the national banking institutions totaling US$49.51 million, among which there were domestic government bonds with a nominal value of 1.021 billion US dollars and ₴1.495 billion.

Later, a representative of the PGO specified that 49.3 million US dollars had been arrested by the court in Latvia. No further information about the arrest of domestic government bonds has been provided up to the present moment.

But in December 2015, the defense of Arbuzov collected and released the official responses of the Latvian government agencies. Thus, according to the Information Center of the Ministry of Internal Affairs of Latvia, "there is no information about criminal proceedings initiated against Sergiy Arbuzov." Latvian Grand jury of officers of justice also denies that there are any cases in proceedings records in which Arbuzov could be a creditor or debtor. Given this, according to Sergei Kovalyov, a lawyer of Arbuzov, the statement of the Prosecutor General's Office of Ukraine on the alleged arrest of $49.3 million in Arbuzov's accounts by the Latvian law enforcement agencies is not valid.

Thus, the Prosecutor General's Office of Ukraine has not yet been able to confirm any of the accusations against Arbuzov since he resigned from the post of Acting Prime Minister of Ukraine.

Arbuzov does not have an Identification Number of a Physical Person (similar to a Taxpayer Identification Number in the United States), having refused one for religious reasons. Instead, Arbuzov uses his passport number as the legal alternative.

In January 2015, Arbuzov and an experts group from the Association "Centre for Research into Economic and Sociocultural Upward Enhancement of CIS Countries, Central and Eastern Europe" addressed political and public figures of the West and Russia with the initiative to create the so-called "Coalition of intellect". It was noted in an open letter that the conflict in Ukraine had threatened all the positive things that have been achieved in the development of the European security system over the past 25 years. Instead of strengthening stability in the region, the parties of the conflict undermine cooperation and unleash a new arms race. "We need the intervention of the international community, the creation of a broad "Coalition of intellect", coalition for de-escalation. With its help, we could find a way out of the situation based on a broad civilized approach, but not a limited geopolitical one", - said ex-prime minister in his letter.

References

External links
About the appointment of Sergij Arbuzov as the chairman of the National Bank of Ukraine. Website of the National Bank of Ukraine.
Leshchenko, S. The new head of the National Bank Arbuzov: in the name of Father, the Son, and the Donetsk spirit.... Ukrayinska Pravda. 2010-12-23
Patykivsky, Yu. Chair for a cashier. Ukrayina moloda. 2010-12-24
Profile at Obozrevatel.com
Official website of the All-Ukrainian Bank of Development (Russian/Ukrainian)

|-

|-

1976 births
Living people
Politicians from Donetsk
Our Ukraine (political party) politicians
Party of Regions politicians
Acting prime ministers of Ukraine
First vice prime ministers of Ukraine
Governors of the National Bank of Ukraine
Pro-government people of the Euromaidan
Ukrainian bankers
21st-century Ukrainian economists
Donetsk National University alumni
Fugitives wanted by Ukraine
Russian individuals subject to European Union sanctions
Businesspeople from Donetsk